

News shares

Highest-rated news and public affairs shows

Metropolitan
 Data based on the five metropolitan markets only.

Weekly ratings – 2009 

Data based on the five metropolitan markets only according to OzTam weekly data released every Tuesday at their website.

News ratings, 2008